Belvidere (from the Latin bellus + videre, meaning "beautiful sight") may refer to:

Places

Australia
 Belvidere, South Australia, a small town southeast of Strathalbyn
 Belvidere Range, South Australia, a mountain range
 Hundred of Belvidere, a district north of the Barossa Valley in South Australia
 District Council of Belvidere, a former local government area governing the hundred

United States

 Belvidere, Idaho, a place in Valley County, Idaho
 Belvidere Township, Boone County, Illinois
 Belvidere, Illinois, a city within the township
 Belvidere, Kansas
 Belvidere Township, Michigan
 Belvidere Township, Minnesota
 Belvidere, Minnesota, a former post office in Belvidere Township
 Belvidere (Natchez, Mississippi), on the NRHP
 Belvidere, Nebraska
 Belvidere, New Jersey
 Belvidere Historic District (Belvidere, New Jersey), on the NRHP
 Belvidere, New York, a place in Allegany County, New York
 Belvidere (Belmont, New York), on the NRHP
 Belvidere, North Carolina,  an unincorporated community
 Belvidere (Belvidere, North Carolina), on the NRHP
 Belvidere (Williamsboro, North Carolina), on the NRHP
 Belvidere Plantation House, Hampstead, North Carolina, on the NRHP
 Belvidere Historic District (Hertford, North Carolina), on the NRHP
 The Belvidere, a mansion in Claremore, Oklahoma, on the NRHP in Rogers County, Oklahoma
 Belvidere, South Dakota
 Belvidere, Tennessee
 Belvidere, Vermont
 Belvidere (Goochland County, Virginia), a historic farm property
 Belvidere, Wisconsin

Elsewhere
 Belvidere, County Westmeath, Ireland, a townland in the civil parish of Moylisker
 Belvidere, Western Cape, South Africa

Schools
 Belvidere School, Shrewsbury, Shropshire, England
 Belvidere High School (Illinois), United States
 Belvidere High School (New Jersey), United States

See also
 Belvedere (disambiguation)
 Belvidere Hill Historic District, Lowell, Massachusetts, on the NRHP